is a passenger railway station operated by the Takamatsu-Kotohira Electric Railroad in Takamatsu, Kagawa, Japan.  It is operated by the private transportation company Takamatsu-Kotohira Electric Railroad (Kotoden) and is designated station "N04".

Lines
Hayashimichi Station is a station on the Kotoden Nagao Line and is located 2.7 km from the terminus of the line at Kawaramachi Station and 4.4 kilometers from Takamatsu-Chikkō Station.

Layout
The station consists of one side platform serving a single bi-directioanl track. The station is unattended.

Adjacent stations

History
Hayashimichi Station opened on April 30, 1912 as a station on the Takamatsu Electric Tramway. It was closed in 1934, and reopened as a station on the Takamatsu Kotohira Electric Railway on August 1, 1954.

Surrounding area
Takamatsu Municipal Kita Elementary School
Takamatsu Municipal Kita Minami Elementary School

Passenger statistics

See also
 List of railway stations in Japan

References

External links

  

Railway stations in Japan opened in 1954
Railway stations in Takamatsu